Injection or injected may refer to:

Science and technology
 Injective function, a mathematical function mapping distinct arguments to distinct values
 Injection (medicine), insertion of liquid into the body with a syringe
 Injection, in broadcasting, the level at which a subcarrier is sent by the transmitter, expressed as a percent of total modulation
 Injection quill, used in the petrochemical industry to insert chemicals, typically inhibitors, for proper mixture within a base chemical
 Fuel injection, a means of metering fuel into an internal combustion engine
 Orbit injection, changing a stable orbit into a transfer orbit
 Injection, in construction, insertion of consolidation materials (i.e., cement grout mixtures, gravel) by means of dry type rotary shortcrete high pressure pumps 
 Injection well 
 Injection moulding, a technique for making parts from plastic material

Computing
 Code injection, a security violation technique using unexpected program modification
 Dependency injection, a programming design pattern, also referred to as inversion of control
 Email injection, a security violation technique using web email forms
 Fault injection, a software testing technique
 Network injection, an attack on access points that are exposed to non-filtered network traffic
 SQL injection, a security violation technique using database commands

Arts, entertainment and media
 Injected (album), a 1995 album by Phunk Junkeez
 Injected (band), a rock band from Atlanta, Georgia
 Injection (comics), an Image Comics science fiction series by Warren Ellis and Declan Shalvey
 "Injection", song by Rise Against from The Sufferer & the Witness, 2006

Other uses
 Injection (economics), a financial boost to an economy
 Drug injection of recreational drugs

See also
 Injunction
 Interjection